Gary Graham (born June 21, 1969) is an American fashion designer and artist. His fashion line GaryGraham422 operates out of his flagship boutique and design studio in Franklin, New York. His clothing reflects his interest in history, storytelling, and the roles of women in society.

Early life 
Graham was born and raised in Wilmington, Delaware. After graduating from Newark High School, he studied painting for a year at Maryland Institute College of Art before transferring to the School of the Art Institute of Chicago to study fashion design and performance art. Graham moved to New York City in 1993 where he worked for a costume production house and for Julie Taymor as a costume designer on projects like the award-winning Lion King, where he learned some of the techniques and skills he still employs like garment dying and cutting. He then apprenticed with fashion designer J. Morgan Puett for six years before working in product development at ABC Carpet & Home in New York City.

Career and brand 
In 1999 Graham launched his eponymous line which was sold at Soho's iconic If Boutique. He quickly earned a reputation for his "elegantly deconstructed clothing, sophisticated craftsmanship and unique custom prints". In 2006 he opened his first boutique on the first floor of ABC Carpet & Home where he used to work.

In 2009 he established his flagship store and studio in downtown New York's Tribeca neighborhood. The boutique achieved an instant cult following, counting fans such as Jamie Bochert, Julia Roberts, Karen O and Helena Bonham Carter, the same year Graham was honored as a CFDA/Vogue finalist. His clothing line, including the capsule collection Anagram, was sold at select luxury retailers worldwide, like Dover Street Market, Joyce Hong Kong and Barneys New York. In 2016, Graham asked seven of his muses and friends, Gina Gershon, Alexandra Marzella, Jennifer Nettles, Parker Posey, Sunrise Ruffalo, Kara Walker and Naomi Yang to model his fall collection as female archetypes in a short film titled Palacetor.

In 2017 he closed his New York City business and relocated to rural upstate New York where he relaunched his line as GaryGraham422 (422 referring to the street address of his new boutique and studio). GaryGraham422 is "a site-specific creative endeavor dedicated to creating small-batch collections of hand-finished garments using antique textiles and custom jacquards". Later that year, Graham released his Fall 2017 ready-to-wear collection which was inspired by the 1870s Gothic Revival mansion located in Warwick, Rhode Island.

In July 2021, Graham was featured as a finalist on season 2 of the Amazon TV series Making the Cut, a fashion design reality competition, and created an accompanying GaryGraham422 collection for Amazon Fashion.

Industry recognition 
 2009: CFDA/Vogue Fashion Fund Finalist
 2010: Legend of Fashion Award, The School of the Art Institute of Chicago
 He is a member of the Council of Fashion Designers of America.

Personal life 
Graham lives in the Catskills village of Franklin, New York in a historic former bank, with his partner Sean Scherer.

References

Sources 
 Jessica Reaves, Designers Mantra: Learn in Chicago, Then Leave, New York Times, April 30, 2010
 Laird Borrelli-Persson, Gary Graham and His Collaborators Are Rewriting History One Embroidery Stitch at a Time, Vogue, July 23, 2020
 Eddie Roche, Making the Cut's Gary Graham Looks at the Show as His Reinvention, Daily Front Row, July 16, 2021
 James Kleinmann, Exclusive Interview: Making the Cut Season 2 Fashion Designer Gary Graham ,Queer Review, July 6, 2021
 Jessica Binns, Levi's Goes Avant-Garde on Amazon's 'Making the Cut', Sourcing Journal, July 30, 2021

External links 
 GaryGraham422 Official Website
 Gary Graham: Looking Back to Look Forward special exhibit at Hancock Shaker Village in Hancock MA

1969 births
Living people
American fashion designers
LGBT fashion designers
Artists from Wilmington, Delaware
School of the Art Institute of Chicago alumni
Maryland Institute College of Art alumni